= Twentysevens =

Australian blues rock band

- Origin: Brisbane, Australia
- Genres: Blues rock Rock
- Years active: 2005–present
- Labels: Independent
- Members: Steve Tyson; John Barr; Dave Parnell
- Website: Official Site

Twentysevens (styled as twentysevens) are an Australian blues rock band, best known for being the support act during Status Quo's 2006 Winter Tour, consisting of 31 dates in major UK venues.

== History ==
Members of various other bands Steve Tyson, John Barr and Dave Parnell met up in summer 2005 to write an album without the pressures of touring. The album Songs From the Middle Ages was recorded in guitarist and vocalist Tyson's studio and released in Australia in early 2006.

The album received solid radio support across the country, and in May 2006, the band were invited to support Foreigner on their Australian tour. They also supported Status Quo during their show at Twin Towns in Queensland. Status Quo subsequently asked the band to support them on their full 31-date tour of the United Kingdom.

To commemorate this, the band went back to the studio and recorded some additional tracks for their 2006 EP Diplomatic, which was sold in all venues on the tour.

A DVD of the tour, Keeping up with the Status Quo, was released alongside their upcoming album Sex Politics and Religion in October 2008.

== Discography ==
Date of Release	Title
Early 2006	Songs From the Middle Ages
October 2006	Diplomatic
October 2008	Sex Politics and Religion
